The 33rd Vaudreuil and Soulanges Hussars was a short-lived light cavalry regiment of the Non-Permanent Active Militia of the Canadian Militia (now the Canadian Army).

History 
The 33rd Vaudreuil and Soulanges Hussars were first authorized on 15 April 1912. The formation of the 33rd Hussars was an attempt to form a French-speaking cavalry regiment in the Canadian Militia. Its regimental headquarters was temporarily located at Rigaud, Quebec. It was to consist to four squadrons lettered A to D.

On 15 July 1912, "B" Squadron of the 17th Duke of York's Royal Canadian Hussars was transferred to the 33rd Vaudreuil and Soulanges Hussars. In turn, the 17th DYRC Hussars created a replacement squadron from personnel of the recently disbanded 11th Argenteuil Rangers.

However, the regiment was never fully organized, and with the outbreak of the First World War, by 1 October 1914, the 33rd Hussars were disbanded. It was the only time the Canadian Militia attempted to form an entirely French-speaking mounted regiment.

See also 

 List of regiments of cavalry of the Canadian Militia (1900–1920)

References 

Hussar regiments of Canada
Military units and formations of Quebec
1912 establishments in Quebec
Military units and formations disestablished in 1914
1914 disestablishments in Canada